Goran is a Slavic male first name, mostly used in south Slavic countries such as Croatia, Serbia, North Macedonia, Montenegro and Bosnia and Herzegovina.

Goran is a Slavic, Pre-Christian name, meaning "highlander" or a mountain-man, someone who lives in the mountains. Hence, Goran in Slavic tradition would mean someone who enjoys and values life in the mountains. 

In former Yugoslavia, Mladi Gorani was a Yugoslav Youth Organization tasked with re-foresting Yugoslav highlands.

Variations 

Nicknames and cognomen include Gogi , Gogo .

 female Goranka (Горанка)
 female Gorana (Горана), nickname Goca

Name day 
 February 24 in the Roman Catholic Calendar
 July 31 in the Serbian Orthodox Calendar

Famous namesakes 
 Goran Bogdanović (politician) (born 1963), Serbian politician
 Goran Bogdanović (footballer born 1967), retired Serbian footballer
 Goran Bregović, Bosnian musician and composer
 Goran Bunjevčević, retired Serbian footballer
 Goran Dragić, Slovene basketball player
 Goran Đorović, retired Serbian footballer
 Goran Cvijanović, Slovenian football player
 Goran Čolak, Croatian free diver, World champion and World record holder
 Goran Gavrančić, Serbian footballer
 Goran Hadžić, Serbian politician in Croatia accused of crimes against humanity
 Goran Ivanišević, Croatian tennis player, 2001 Wimbledon Champion
 Goran Jevtić (actor), Serbian actor and director
 Goran Jurić, Croatian and Yugoslavian international footballer
 Goran Karan, Croatian pop singer
 Ivan Goran Kovačić, Croatian poet
 Goran Marić (footballer) (born 1984), Serbian footballer
 Goran Marić (volleyball) (born 1981), Serbian volleyball player
 Goran Obradović (disambiguation), several people
 Goran Pandev, Macedonian football player
 Goran Popov, Macedonian footballer
 Goran Sablić, Croatian footballer
 Goran Senjanović, Croatian physicist
 Goran Slavkovski, Macedonian-Swedish footballer
 Goran Suton, Bosnian-American basketball player who played for Michigan State University
 Goran Višnjić, Croatian actor
 Goran Vlaović, Croatian footballer
 Goran Milev, Serbian actor
 Goran Vuković, Serbian gangster

References

Serbian masculine given names
Croatian masculine given names
Bulgarian masculine given names
Macedonian masculine given names
Montenegrin masculine given names
Bosnian masculine given names
Slovene masculine given names
Slavic masculine given names
Czech masculine given names
Slovak masculine given names